"Winter: Winter Rose / Duet -winter ver.-" is a single released by South Korean duo Tohoshinki. The single features the songs "Winter Rose" as well as the re-cut single "Duet" from the Tone album, although remixed to have a holiday feel to it.

Background
"Winter Rose" was featured in a Seven-net Shopping Commercial. The single was also released in South Korea.

Music video
A music video for "Winter Rose" was shot, but was not included with the CD+DVD version of the single.

Chart performance
The single was released November 30, 2011, and sold 76,615 units on its first day of release. It peaked at #2 on both the daily chart the weekly chart on the Oricon chart. The single sold over 153,177 copies.

Track list

Charts

Sales and certifications

Release history

References

External links
 TVXQ Official SMTOWN Website
 Tohoshinki Official Japanese Website

TVXQ songs
2011 singles
Avex Trax singles
2011 songs